Darren Dilley (born March 7, 1967) is an American professional sports car racing driver and an elementary school physical education teacher. He last competed part-time in the NASCAR Xfinity Series, driving the No. 38 Ford Mustang for RSS Racing.

Early racing career
In 1990, Darren and his dad, Bert, would start up Cheap Fast Racing, a Sports Car Club of America team.

NASCAR
On May 30, 2022, RSS Racing would announce that they had tapped Dilley to race the team's 38 car at Portland International Raceway for the 2022 Pacific Office Automation 147.

Personal life
Dilley currently works as an elementary PE teacher.

Dilley graduated from Clackamas High School in 1985.

In 2006, Dilley's house was destroyed in a fatal plane crash when pilot Robert E. Guilford crashed during an air show and crashed into a Hillsboro, Oregon, neighborhood.

Motorsports career results

NASCAR
(key) (Bold – Pole position awarded by qualifying time. Italics – Pole position earned by points standings or practice time. * – Most laps led.)

Xfinity Series

References

External links
 
 Cheap Fast Racing's official website

1967 births
Living people
NASCAR drivers
Racing drivers from Oregon
Racing drivers from Portland, Oregon
Sportspeople from Hillsboro, Oregon